"Massachusetts" is a song by the Norwegian duo Ylvis. The music video was uploaded onto YouTube on 22 October 2013 and had over 14.7 million views .

References

2013 songs
Comedy songs
Songs about Massachusetts
Ylvis songs
2013 YouTube videos